Venkatakrishnan is a surname. Notable people with the surname include: 

C. S. Venkatakrishnan, American banker, CEO of Barclays 
Srinivasan Venkatakrishnan, British business executive